Rushley Island is a small uninhabited island in Essex, England.  It is the smallest of six islands comprising an archipelago in Essex, and is privately owned. A seawall was first constructed in the 1780s by John Harriott, and the island has been the object of farming activities since then.

The local racehorse trainer and one-time Rushley Island owner, Frank Threadgold, once bred a horse which he named after the island. Born in 1976, she was a bay mare with horseracing parents called Crooner and Vicki Ann. She was later trained at the famous Newmarket track by Mr. H. C. Westbrook and was entered as a two-year-old for four races, mainly over a distance of six furlongs, between September and November 1978. These took place at Yarmouth, Lingfield (twice) and Doncaster.  She was not a tremendously successful racehorse, finishing, at best, second from last in all these races, and she was retired for breeding purposes back into the ownership of the Threadgold family at Southend-on-Sea, who have farmed land at nearby Great Wakering since the 1930s. She did not prove to be too successful at breeding either, although she did have one colt, a bay called Tudor Rhythm, in 1980, which was never raced. In 1987, she was officially retired from stud and disappeared from the record books.

References

Islands of Essex
Uninhabited islands of England
Rochford District
Private islands of the United Kingdom